Yegor Yuryevich Nikulin (born 16 January 1997) is a Russian football player.

Club career
He made his professional debut in the Russian Professional Football League for FC Chertanovo Moscow on 28 August 2014 in a game against FC Kaluga.

He made his Russian Football National League debut for FC Spartak-2 Moscow on 22 July 2017 in a game against FC Tambov.

On 24 June 2018, he signed with FC Shinnik Yaroslavl.

References

External links
 Career summary by sportbox.ru

1997 births
Sportspeople from Chelyabinsk
Living people
Russian footballers
Association football midfielders
Russian expatriate footballers
Russia youth international footballers
Expatriate footballers in Portugal
U.D. Leiria players
FC Shinnik Yaroslavl players
FC Chertanovo Moscow players
FC Spartak-2 Moscow players